The 2006 Harrow Council election took place on 4 May 2006 to elect members of Harrow London Borough Council in London, England. The whole council was up for election and the Conservative Party gained control of the council after there being no overall control.

Election result

|}

Ward results

Belmont

Canons

Edgware

Greenhill

Harrow on the Hill

Harrow Weald

Hatch End

Headstone North

Headstone South

Kenton East

Kenton West

Marlborough

Pinner

Pinner South

Queensbury

Rayners Lane

Roxbourne

Roxeth

Stanmore Park

Wealdstone

West Harrow

References

Council elections in the London Borough of Harrow
2006 London Borough council elections